The 1993 Southland Conference baseball tournament was held from May 16 to 18, 1993 to determine the champion of the Southland Conference in the sport of college baseball for the 1993 season.  The event pitted the top four finishers from the conference's regular season in a double-elimination tournament held at H. Alvin Brown–C. C. Stroud Field on the campus of Northwestern State in Natchitoches, Louisiana.  Fourth-seeded  won their first championship and claimed the automatic bid to the 1993 NCAA Division I baseball tournament.

Seeding and format
The top six finishers from the regular season were seeded one through six.  They played a double-elimination tournament.

Bracket and results

All-Tournament Team
The following players were named to the All-Tournament Team.

Most Valuable Player
Clint Gould was named Tournament Most Valuable Player.  Gould was a first baseman for McNeese State.

References

Tournament
Southland Conference Baseball Tournament
Southland Conference baseball tournament
Southland Conference baseball tournament